Carn Bhac (945 m) is a mountain in the Grampian Mountains of Scotland. It lies north of the village of Inverey in Aberdeenshire, in the southern Mounth area.

One of quieter peaks in the area, it offers a great chance for solitude and reflection. Climbs usually start from Inverey.

References

Mountains and hills of Aberdeenshire
Marilyns of Scotland
Munros